The Institut National Polytechnique Félix Houphouët-Boigny (INP-HB) is a public  institute of higher education, research and production in Yamoussoukro in Côte d'Ivoire.

It is named after Félix Houphouët-Boigny, the country's first president.

Components 

The institute consists of these  (schools for higher learning / advanced training):

  (ESA, ‘School for Advanced Training in Agronomy’).
  (ESI, ‘Industry’): for computer science, mechanics and chemistry.
  (ESCAE, ‘Business Studies and Management’): also for marketing and insurance.
  (ESM, ‘Mining and Geology’): also for petroleum extraction/processing, and water treatment.
  (ESTP, ‘Public Works’): for civil engineering.

In addition, there are the:
  (EFCPC, ‘Continuing Education and Management Development School’), and
  (EDP), a doctoral school

These are among the country's .
There are also discipline-based departments that are connected to the schools.

History

Founding 

The institute is the result of the merger of the city's four :

  (ENSTP, ‘National School for Advanced Training in Public Works’) (1962, 1979–1996).  
  (ENSA, ‘National School for Advanced Training in Agronomy’) (1965, 1989–1996). 
  (IAB, ‘Bouaké Institute of Agriculture’) (1977–1996). Despite the name, it had already moved from Bouaké to Yamoussoukro. 
  (INSET, ‘National Advanced Technical Training Institute’) (1975, 1983–1996). 

The successors of the agronomy and civil engineering schools have dropped the word "national" from their official names.

Subsequent developments 

Since 2011, the Ivorian state has taken matters in hand by appointing a new INP-HB director-general, Koffi N'Guessan, to restore its credentials. This team has been taking steps to revitalize the institute. , signed by France and some African states, allows INP-HB to obtain some support from France.

Campuses 

There are three founding campuses: 
Dorms are on this campus.

See also 
 Université Félix Houphouët-Boigny: with the same namesake

References

External links 
 

Universities in Ivory Coast
Buildings and structures in Yamoussoukro
Educational institutions established in 1996
1996 establishments in Ivory Coast